Sheela Nagar is a neighborhood in the southern part of Visakhapatnam City, India. It is under the local administrative limits of Greater Visakhapatnam Municipal Corporation, located about 13 km from the Visakhapatnam Railway Station and about 4 km from the Visakhapatnam Airport.

About
Sheela Nagar contains many large residential complexes. Sheela Nagar has the scope for very high development as it is surrounded by major areas like Gajuwaka and NAD X Road. The basic infrastructure like the roads, sewage and drinking water are better comparative to most other parts of the Visakhapatnam City. GVMC has taken over the Sheela Nagar area and bringing in the amenities needed like road, sewage and drinking water.

Real estate 
There is a huge demand for land now in Sheela Nagar. Also, land prices are high in this area.  Recently employees of PSUs like ONGC, HPCL, VSP, NaPrVa are investing in this area.

Places of worship
Some of the famous temples in this area are Ayappa Swamy Temple.

Education
There are a good number of schools and colleges for all budgets.

Entertainment
There is a multiplex called STBL Cineworld for entertainment. Screen-1 is drive in theater first time in both telugu states. Screen-2 is an indoor theatre and screen-3 is container theater.

Transport
APSRTC runs the buses to this suburb, connecting it to all parts of the city. Sheela Nagar is well connected to Gajuwaka, NAD X Road, Kancharapalem and RTC Complex.

APSRTC routes:

References

External links

Neighbourhoods in Visakhapatnam